Prostoma is a genus of freshwater nemerteans, containing the following species:
Prostoma asensoriatum Montgomery, 1896
Prostoma canadiensis Gibson & Moore, 1978
Prostoma communopore Senz, 1996
Prostoma eilhardi (Montgomery, 1894)
Prostoma graecense (Böhmig, 1892)
Prostoma hercegovinense Tarman, 1961
Prostoma jenningsi Gibson & Young, 1971
Prostoma kolasai Gibson & Moore, 1976
Prostoma ohmiense Chernyshev et al., 1998
Prostoma puteale Beauchamp, 1932

References

External links

Tetrastemmatidae
Nemertea genera